Kierzkowo may refer to the following places:
Kierzkowo, Greater Poland Voivodeship (west-central Poland)
Kierzkowo, Kuyavian-Pomeranian Voivodeship (north-central Poland)
Kierzkowo, Gdańsk County in Pomeranian Voivodeship (north Poland)
Kierzkowo, Wejherowo County in Pomeranian Voivodeship (north Poland)
Kierzkowo, Koszalin County in West Pomeranian Voivodeship (north-west Poland)
Kierzkowo, Szczecinek County in West Pomeranian Voivodeship (north-west Poland)